William James Charles Hutchinson is a Jamaican politician from the Labour Party. He is the Minister of State in the Ministry of Transport and Mining.

References 

Living people
Government ministers of Jamaica
21st-century Jamaican politicians
People from Saint Elizabeth Parish
Jamaica Labour Party politicians
Members of the House of Representatives of Jamaica
Year of birth missing (living people)
Members of the 11th Parliament of Jamaica
Members of the 12th Parliament of Jamaica
Members of the 13th Parliament of Jamaica
Members of the 14th Parliament of Jamaica
20th-century Jamaican politicians